Lead tetrafluoride is a compound of lead and fluorine.  The yellow solid (melting point 600 °C) is the only room-temperature stable tetrahalide of lead. Lead tetrafluoride is isostructural with tin(IV) fluoride and contains planar layers of octahedrally coordinated lead, where the octahedra share four corners and there are two terminal, unshared, fluorine atoms trans to one another.

References

Lead(IV) compounds
Fluorides
Metal halides